José Ignacio Fernández Iglesias (born 18 January 1990), known as Nacho, is a Spanish professional footballer who plays as a defender for La Liga club Real Madrid and the Spain national team.

He has spent his entire career with Real Madrid after making his debut with the first team in 2011, making over 200 appearances and winning several trophies, including five Champions Leagues.

Nacho won his first senior cap for Spain in 2013, and was on the squad at the 2018 FIFA World Cup.

Club career
Born in Madrid, Nacho arrived in Real Madrid's youth system at the age of 11. He made his senior debut in 2008–09, playing two games with the reserves in Segunda División B and subsequently appearing in a further two full seasons in that level; it was during this time he formed a long-lasting friendship with future Russian national team player Denis Cheryshev.

On 23 April 2011, Nacho made his first-team – and La Liga – debut, starting as a left back in a 6–3 away win against Valencia CF and playing in the entire match. His second appearance came the following week, in a 2–3 home loss to Real Zaragoza.

Nacho was one of the youth team players chosen to accompany the first team on their summer friendlies in North America, prior to the start of the 2011–12 campaign. He came on as a substitute in all three matches, against the LA Galaxy, C.D. Guadalajara and Philadelphia Union.

On 2 September 2012, main squad manager José Mourinho announced that Nacho, along with Álvaro Morata and Jesús, would be promoted to the first team but continue to play with Castilla. He became an official full-time member at the start of 2013–14, receiving the number 18 shirt after the departure of Raúl Albiol.

On 3 July 2014, Nacho signed a new contract with Real Madrid until 2021. He scored his first official goal for them on 10 January of the following year, closing the score in a 3–0 home victory against RCD Espanyol.

Two minutes after replacing the injured Marcelo in a UEFA Champions League group stage match against Paris Saint-Germain F.C. on 3 November 2015, Nacho scored the only goal and sealed his team's advance to the last-16 with his first goal in a European competition. He contributed with five appearances, as the tournament ended in conquest.

On 11 February 2017, Nacho made his 100th appearance for Real Madrid in a 3–1 away win against CA Osasuna. Benefitting from injuries and suspensions to teammates, he was the most utilized player in the centre-back position as the club won its first national championship in five years; he added four matches in the Champions League, again conquered by his team.

Nacho scored his first career brace on 21 January 2018, in a 7–1 win over Deportivo de La Coruña. During that year's Champions League he made eight appearances while scoring one goal, when Madrid won their third consecutive and 13th overall title in the tournament; in the decisive match against Liverpool, he featured at right-back after replacing the injured Dani Carvajal late into the first half of an eventual 3–1 win in Kyiv.

The 2019–20 season for Nacho was dominated by injuries, and he only made six appearances during the league season as Real Madrid won the 2019–20 La Liga.

In July 2021, he extended his contract for two more years, until 2023.

International career

After playing for Spain at under-17, under-19 and under-21 levels, Nacho was first called by the full side on 2 September 2013 for a friendly with Switzerland to be held eight days later, in place of injured Iñigo Martínez. He made his debut by replacing Real Madrid teammate Sergio Ramos early into the second half of the 2–2 draw against Chile in Geneva.

Nacho was named in Spain's final squad for the 2018 FIFA World Cup. He scored his first goal for his country on 15 June, starting as right-back in the group stage fixture against Portugal and netting with a curled shot from 30 meters in a 3–3 draw.

Style of play
A player known for his versatility in every defensive position on the pitch, both Julen Lopetegui and Zinedine Zidane used Nacho as a centre, right and left back. He is seen as a reliable full-back option due to his skills on the ball and penchant for making forward runs down his flank; a fast and agile defender who is known for his work rate, endurance and strength in the air despite not being particularly tall for his position.

Apart from his defensive skills, Nacho is also a competent passer of the ball in both short and long distances, with a 92.2% pass completion and accuracy in 2017–18. During the same season, he scored five goals from set pieces.

Personal life
Nacho's younger brother, Álex, is also a footballer. A midfielder, he too graduated from Real Madrid's academy, and both made their first-team debut in the same game; Álex moved on, settling at Cádiz CF, and they played against one another in 2020. Their physical appearance is quite dissimilar, owing to Álex's red hair.

In November 2016, Nacho revealed that he has lived with type 1 diabetes since he was 12 years old. Throughout his first five years in the first team, Nacho managed to avoid major injuries, attributing his success to his eating habits and preparation.

He has three children with his wife María Cortés, a daughter and two sons.

Career statistics

Club

International

Scores and results list Spain's goal tally first, score column indicates score after each Nacho goal.

Honours
Real Madrid Castilla
Segunda División B: 2011–12 (Group 1); 2012 (overall champions)

Real Madrid
La Liga: 2011–12, 2016–17, 2019–20, 2021–22
Copa del Rey: 2013–14
Supercopa de España: 2012, 2017, 2021–22
UEFA Champions League: 2013–14, 2015–16, 2016–17, 2017–18, 2021–22
UEFA Super Cup: 2016, 2017, 2022
FIFA Club World Cup: 2014, 2016, 2017, 2018, 2022

Spain U17
UEFA European Under-17 Championship: 2007
FIFA U-17 World Cup runner-up: 2007

Spain U21
UEFA European Under-21 Championship: 2013

References

External links

Real Madrid official profile

1990 births
Living people
Footballers from Madrid
Spanish footballers
People with type 1 diabetes
Association football defenders
La Liga players
Segunda División players
Segunda División B players
Real Madrid Castilla footballers
Real Madrid CF players
Spain youth international footballers
Spain under-21 international footballers
Spain international footballers
2018 FIFA World Cup players
UEFA Champions League winning players